= Tino Luis =

Spanish footballer (born 1970)

Personal information
- Full name: Agustín Luis Cabrera González
- Date of birth: 15 September 1970 (age 56)
- Place of birth: Las Palmas, Spain
- Position: Midfielder

Senior career*
Years	Team	Apps	(Gls)
1991-1996	UD Las Palmas		
- * Club domestic league appearances and goals

Agustín Luis Cabrera (born 15 September 1970), was a Spanish footballer and coach who played for UD Las Palmas.

== Post career ==
After retiring from professional football Tino Luis coached various teams at the Segunda División B level.
